Paulie Gee (born Paul Giannone) is an American restaurateur who founded the eponymous Paulie Gee's pizzeria in Greenpoint, Brooklyn, New York.

Early life 
Gee was born in the Kensington section of Brooklyn. He is of Italian and Jewish descent.

Career 
Prior to opening Paulie Gee's, Gee had a career in Information Technology, working for various telecommunications corporations and later as a consultant. Disillusioned with his career, he built a pizza oven in his backyard and developed a following in the online pizza community.

Gee opened Paulie Gee's pizzeria in Greenpoint, Brooklyn in March 2010, known for its eclectic topping combinations and rustic dining experience. The "Hellboy" pizza with soppressata and Mike's Hot Honey quickly became a specialty at the restaurant.

Paulie Gee's has since opened and licensed additional locations across the United States in Columbus, Baltimore, Chicago, and New Orleans.

Gee has made a variety of media and public speaking appearances since opening Paulie Gee's, often noted for his career change late in life.

References 

American restaurateurs
People from Kensington, Brooklyn
American people of Italian-Jewish descent
Year of birth missing (living people)
Living people